The history of ambassadors of the United States to Poland began in 1919.

Until the end of World War I, Poland had been partitioned between Russia, Germany, and Austria-Hungary. After the war and the collapse of the empires, Poland became an independent republic in 1918.

The United States recognized the Second Polish Republic and established diplomatic relations. The first U.S. Minister to Poland was Hugh S. Gibson, appointed in 1919.

Diplomatic relations were maintained throughout the years of World War II with the government-in-exile of Poland resident in London.

The U.S. Embassy in Poland is located in Warsaw.

Ambassadors

See also
Poland – United States relations
Foreign relations of Poland
Ambassadors of the United States

References

United States Department of State: Background notes on Poland

External links
 United States Department of State: Chiefs of Mission for Poland
 United States Department of State: Poland
 United States Embassy in Warsaw

Poland
 
United States